This is a list of people connected to Stockholm, Sweden.

A

 Pontus Åberg (born 1993) ice hockey
 Vilma Abrahamsson (born 1999) football
 Per Ahlmark (1939–2018) politician
 Anna Ahlström (1863–1943) teacher 
 Knut Ahnlund (1923–2012) historian
 Mikael Åkerfeldt (born 1974) musician
 Jonas Åkerlund (born 1965) films
 Hugo Alfvén (1872–1960) musician
 Carl Jonas Love Almqvist (1793–1866) author, poet & composer.
 Lars Amble (1939–2015) actor
 Ellen Ammann (1870-1932) politician 
 Benny Andersson (born 1946) ABBA
 Bibi Andersson (1935–2019) actress 
 Harriet Andersson (born 1932) actress
 Leif Erland Andersson (1943–1979) astronomer
 Max Andersson (born 1962) comics
 Björn Andrésen (born 1955) actor
 Johan Jacob Anckarström (1762–1792) military officer & royal assassin
 Mikael Appelgren(born 1961) table tennis
 Ellen Arkbro (born 1990) composer
 Rozita Auer (born 1952) belly dancer 
 Tor Aulin (1866–1914) violinist

B

 Sven-Erik Bäck (1919–1994) composer 
 Carl Michael Bellman (1740–1795) songwriter, composer, musician & poet.
 Natanael Berg (1879–1957) composer
 Bo Bergman (1869–1967) writer
 Ingrid Bergman (1915–1982) actress
 Hanna Bergstrøm (1885–1948) politician
 Sune Bergström (1916–2004) biochemist
 Folke Bernadotte (1895–1948) diplomacy
 Lennart Bernadotte (1909–2004) landscaper, filmmaker & photographer
 Jenny Berthelius (1923-2019) writer 
 Franz Berwald (1796–1868) composer
 Johan Fredrik Berwald (1787–1861) violinist, conductor and composer
 Elsa Beskow (1874–1953) author 
 Ivan Betskoy (1704–1795) education 
 Carl Bildt (born 1949) diplomacy
 Hugo Birger) (1854–1887) painter
 August Blanche (1811–1868) novelist
 Joakim Bonnier (1930–1972) driver 
 Björn Borg (born 1956) tennis player
 Ali Boulala (born 1979) skateboarder
 Jesper Bratt (born 1998) ice hockey player
 Sophia Elisabet Brenner(1659–1730) poet
 Oscar Byström (1821–1909) composer

C

 Bernt Carlsson (1938–1988) diplomat 
 Sir William Chambers, (1726–1796).
 Charles IX of Sweden, (1550–1611).
 Charles XI of Sweden, (1655–1697).
 Charles XII of Sweden, (1682–1718). 
 Charles XIII of Sweden, (1748–1818).
 Charles XV of Sweden, (1826–1872). 
 Charles XVI of Sweden (born 1946) 
 Eagle-Eye Cherry (born 1968) singer 
 Neneh Cherry (born 1964) singer
 Queen Christina, (1626–1689).

D

 Michael Dahl (1659–1743) painter.
 Count Erik Dahlbergh (1625–1703) military engineer & Field marshal.
 Birger Dahlerus (1891–1957) diplomacy
 Carl Dahlström (born 1995) ice hockey
 Tommy Denander (born 1968) guitarist
 Ernst Didring (1868–1931) author

E

 Britt Ekland (born 1942) actress 
 Tzahi Elihen (born 1991), Israeli footballer
 Pelle Eklund (born 1963) ice hockey
 Erik XIV of Sweden (1533–1577). 
 Ulf von Euler (1905–1983) physiologist & pharmacologist

F

 Rebecca Ferguson (born 1983) actress
 Axel von Fersen the Elder (1719–1794) statesman and soldier.
 Axel von Fersen the Younger (1755–1810) diplomat and statesman.
 Forsen (born 1990) video streamer
 Erik Ivar Fredholm (1866–1927) maths

G

 Greta Garbo (1905–1990) actress
 Anders Gärderud (born 1946) athlete
 Magnus Hedman (born 1973) footballer
 Nicolai Gedda (1925–2017) tenor
 Mikael Gerdén (born 1973) retired professional ice hockey player
 Gustav II Adolf, (1594–1632).
 Gustav III of Sweden, (1746–1792).
 Gustav IV Adolf, (1778–1837).
 Gustaf VI Adolf of Sweden, (1882–1973)

H

 Ivar Hallström (1826-1901) composer
 Lasse Hallström (born 1946) films
 Kurt Hamrin (born 1934) footballer 
 Johan Harmenberg (born 1954) fencer
 Lee Hazlewood (1929–2007) singer 
 Eli Heckscher (1879–1952) economist
 Sven Hedin (1865–1952) explorer 
 Anders Hillborg (born 1954) composer
 Anna Höglund (born 1958) illustrator
 Hans Holmér (1930–2002) civil servant 
 Count Anders Johan von Höpken (1712–1789) statesman.
 Carola Häggkvist (born 1966) singer
 Elsa Hosk (born 1987) model and former Victoria's Secret Angel.

I

 Sebastian Ingrosso (born 1983) DJ

J

 Mattias Janmark (born 1992), ice hockey player
 Agnes Janson (1861–1947), opera singer
 Lennart Johansson (1929–2019), UEFA
 Erland Josephson (1923–2012), actor

K

 J F Karlsson (born 1996), ice hockey
 Oskar Klein] (1894–1977) physicist
 Erland von Koch (1910–2009) composer 
 Helge von Koch (1870–1924) maths
 Vendela Kirsebom (born 1967) model
 Marcus Kruger (born 1970) ice hockey player
 Oliver Kylington (born 1997), ice hockey player

L

 Gabriel Landeskog (b. 1992) ice hockey
 Carl Larsson (1853–1919) painter
 Zara Larsson (born 1997) singer
 Yung Lean (born 1996) rapper
 Jonna Lee (born 1981) singer
 Jenny Lind, (1820–1887), singer.
 Erik Lindahl (1891–1960) economist
 Christian Lindberg (born 1958) trombone
 Barbro Lindgren (born 1937) writer
 Carl Lindhagen (1860–1946) politician
 Paula Lizell (1873–1962) soprano
 Tove Lo (born 1987) singer & actress
 Anna-Lena Löfgren (1944–2010) singer 
 Giovanni di Lorenzo (born 1959) editor
 Ulf Lundell (born 1949) musician  
 Dolph Lundgren (born 1957) actor
 Fredrica Löf (1760–1813) actress

M

 Yngwie Malmsteen (born 1963) guitar
 Jenny Mannerheim (born 1977) arts
 Max Martin (born 1971) singer
 Mijailo Mijailović (born 1978) murderer
 Gösta Mittag-Leffler (1846–1927) maths

N

 Alfred Nobel (1833-1896) chemist, engineer & inventor. 
 Michael Nobel (born 1940) entrepreneur
 H. C. Nordenflycht (1718–1763) poet 
 Elsa-Brita Nordlund (1903–1987) child psychiatrist
 Lars Norén (1944–2021) playwright
 Ludvig Norman (1831–1885) composer
 Mattias Norström (born 1972) ice hockey
 Michael Nylander (born 1972) ice hockey
 Bobby Nystrom (born 1952) ice hockey

O

 Claes Oldenburg (born 1929) sculptor
 Lena Olin born 1955) actress.
 Sigrid Onegin (1889–1943) opera singer 
 Oscar II (1829–1907) king. 
 Anne Sofie von Otter (born 1955) singer
 Bengt Gabrielsson Oxenstierna (1623–1702) statesman.
 Johan Oxenstierna (1611–1657) Count.

P

 Anna Palm de Rosa (1859–1924) artist
 Olof Palme (1927–1986) politician 
 Jesper Parnevik (born 1965) golfer
 Ulrika Pasch (1735–1796) painter
 Johann Patkul (1660–1707) Livonian nobleman & politician. 
 Carl Fredrik Pechlin (1720–1796) politician and demagogue.
 Markus Persson (born 1979) programmer
 Torsten Persson (born 1954) economist
 Count Carl Piper (1647–1716) diplomat & statesman.
 Hedvig Posse (1861–1927)  Missionary in South Africa, linguist and hymn writer

R

 Nino Ramsby (born 1972) musician
 Eddie Razaz (born 1988) singer
 Jonas Renkse (born 1975) musician
 Johan Helmich Roman (1694–1758) Baroque composer
 Robyn (born 1979) singer
 Keke Rosberg (born 1948) racing driver
 Karl Asmund Rudolphi (1771–1832) German naturalist
 Emilia Rydberg (born 1978) singer 
 Edvin Ryding (born 2003) actor

S

 Ilya Salmanzadeh (born 1986) singer
 Johan Tobias Sergel (1740–1814) sculptor
 Emma Sjöberg (born 1968) fashion model
 Maj Sjöwall (1935–2020) crime novelist
 Alexander Skarsgård (born 1976) actor
 Bill Skarsgård (born 1990) actor
 Gustaf Skarsgård (born 1980) actor
 Valter Skarsgård (born 1995) actor
 Lennart Skoglund (1929–1975) footballer
 Count Carl Snoilsky (1841–1903) poet. 
 Kristina Söderbaum (1912–2001) actress
 Hjalmar Söderberg (1869–1941) novelist
 Annika Sörenstam (born 1970) golfer
 Art Spiegelman (born 1948) cartoonist 
 Wilhelm Stenhammar (1871–1927) composer, conductor & pianist
 August Strindberg (1849–1912) playwright, poet & painter. 
 Ulla Strömstedt (1939–1986) actress
 Mats Sundin (born 1971) ice hockey
 Anna Sundstrand  (born 1989) singer
 Magna Sunnerdahl (1863–1935) philanthropist
 Emanuel Swedenborg (1688-1772) theologian, scientist & philosopher.
 Annika Sörenstam (born 1970) golfer

T

 Marie Taglioni (1804–1884) ballet.
 Carl Gustaf Tessin (1695–1770) Count and politician.
 Joakim Thåström (born 1957) singer
 Greta Thunberg (born 2003) activist
 Arne Tiselius (1902–1971) biochemist 
 Sara Torsslow (1795-1859) actress.

V

 Astrid Varnay (1918–2006) soprano

W

 Jan-Ove Waldner (born 1965) table tennis 
 Gerda Wallander (1860–1926) painter
 Per Wästberg (born 1933) writer
 Alexander Wennberg (born 1994) hockey
 Knut Wicksell (1851–1926) economist 
 Beppe Wolgers (1928–1986) poet & actor

Z

 Sophie Zelmani (born 1972) singer

References

Stockholm
Stockholm-related lists